is a passenger railway station in located in the city of  Izumi, Osaka Prefecture, Japan, operated by West Japan Railway Company (JR West).

Lines

Station layout
The station consists of two opposed side platforms connected by an underground passage. The station is staffed.

Platforms

Adjacent stations

|-
!colspan=5|JR West

History
Shinodayama Station opened on 18 July 1929. With the privatization of the Japan National Railways (JNR) on 1 April 1987, the station came under the aegis of the West Japan Railway Company.

Station numbering was introduced in March 2018 with Shinodayama being assigned station number JR-R36.

Passenger statistics
In fiscal 2019, the station was used by an average of 3,930 passengers daily (boarding passengers only).

Surrounding area
 Ikegami-Sone site
Osaka Prefectural Museum of Yayoi Culture
Hakata jin'ya site
Osaka Prefectural Izumi Comprehensive High School
Osaka Prefectural Hakata High School
Izumi City Hakata Elementary School

See also
List of railway stations in Japan

References

External links

 Shinodayama Station Official Site

Railway stations in Osaka Prefecture
Railway stations in Japan opened in 1929
Izumi, Osaka